Dario Schumacher (born 1 April 1993) is a German footballer who plays for 1. FC Bocholt.

Club

References

External links

1993 births
Living people
German footballers
Alemannia Aachen players
FC Schalke 04 II players
Bonner SC players
Rot-Weiß Oberhausen players
1. FC Bocholt players
Footballers from North Rhine-Westphalia
3. Liga players
Regionalliga players
Association football midfielders